The World is Getting Smaller is an album by American jazz fusion group Snarky Puppy that was released in 2007.

Track listing 
All songs composed and arranged by Michael League, except Thorn/Briar (Brian Donohoe) and Fair Play (Chris McQueen)

Personnel 
Source: 
 Michael League – bass guitar
 Jay Jennings – trumpet, flugelhorn
 Sara Jacovino – trombone
 Brian Donohoe – soprano & alto saxophones, clarinet
 Clay Pritchard – tenor saxophone, bass clarinet
 Kait Dunton – synthesizer
 Bob Lanzetti – electric guitar (Tracks 1–7)
 Chris McQueen – electric guitar (All tracks)
 José Aponte – drums (Tracks 3 & 5), percussion (Tracks 3 & 8)
 Rob Avsharian – drums (Tracks 1,2,6 & 7)
 Steve Pruitt – drums (All tracks)
 Nate Werth – percussion
 Juan Alamo – percussion (Track 8)

References 

2007 albums
Snarky Puppy albums